The following is a partial list of the "D" codes for Medical Subject Headings (MeSH), as defined by the United States National Library of Medicine (NLM).

This list continues the information at List of MeSH codes (D20). Codes following these are found at List of MeSH codes (D25). For other MeSH codes, see List of MeSH codes.

The source for this content is the set of 2006 MeSH Trees from the NLM.

– biological factors

– antigens

– allergens

– antigen-antibody complex

– antigens, archaeal

– antigens, bacterial
  – adhesins, bacterial
  – adhesins, escherichia coli
  – lepromin
  – polysaccharides, bacterial
  – bacterial capsules
  – lipopolysaccharides
  – lipid a
  – o antigens
  – peptidoglycan
  – teichoic acids
  – staphylococcal protein a
  – tuberculin

– antigens, dermatophagoides

– antigens, fungal
  – coccidioidin
  – histoplasmin
  – trichophytin

– antigens, helminth

– antigens, heterophile
  – forssman antigen

– antigens, neoplasm
  – antigens, cd24
  – antigens, cd30
  – antigens, cd147
  – antigens, tumor-associated, carbohydrate
  – antigens, cd15
  – ca-15-3 antigen
  – ca-19-9 antigen
  – ca-125 antigen
  – antigens, viral, tumor
  – adenovirus e1a proteins
  – adenovirus e1b proteins
  – antigens, polyomavirus transforming
  – carcinoembryonic antigen
  – neprilysin
  – prostate-specific antigen
  – tissue polypeptide antigen

– antigens, nuclear
  – epstein-barr virus nuclear antigens
  – ki-67 antigen
  – proliferating cell nuclear antigen

– antigens, plant

– antigens, protozoan
  – merozoite surface protein 1
  – variant surface glycoproteins, trypanosoma

– antigens, surface
  – antigens, differentiation
  – antigens, cd
  – activated-leukocyte cell adhesion molecule
  – antigens, cd1
  – antigens, cd2
  – antigens, cd3
  – receptor-cd3 complex, antigen, t-cell
  – antigens, cd4
  – antigens, cd5
  – antigens, cd7
  – antigens, cd8
  – antigens, cd11
  – antigens, cd11a
  – antigens, cd11b
  – antigens, cd11c
  – lymphocyte function-associated antigen-1
  – antigens, cd13
  – antigens, cd14
  – antigens, cd15
  – antigens, cd18
  – antigens, cd19
  – antigens, cd20
  – antigens, cd22
  – antigens, cd24
  – antigens, cd26
  – antigens, cd27
  – antigens, cd28
  – antigens, cd29
  – antigens, cd30
  – antigens, cd31
  – antigens, cd34
  – antigens, cd36
  – antigens, cd38
  – antigens, cd40
  – antigens, cd43
  – antigens, cd45
  – antigens, cd46
  – antigens, cd47
  – antigens, cd55
  – antigens, cd56
  – antigens, cd57
  – antigens, cd58
  – antigens, cd59
  – antigens, cd79
  – antigens, cd80
  – antigens, cd86
  – antigens, cd94
  – antigens, cd95
  – antigens, cd98
  – antigens, cd98 heavy chain
  – antigens, cd98 light chains
  – large neutral amino acid-transporter 1
  – antigens, cd146
  – antigens, cd147
  – antigens, cd164
  – antigens, thy-1
  – cd40 ligand
  – cytokine receptor gp130
  – e-selectin
  – fms-like tyrosine kinase 3
  – integrin alpha1
  – integrin alpha2
  – integrin alpha3
  – integrin alpha4
  – integrin alpha5
  – integrin alpha6
  – integrin alphav
  – integrin beta3
  – integrin beta4
  – intercellular adhesion molecule-1
  – kangai-1 protein
  – lysosomal-associated membrane protein 1
  – lysosomal-associated membrane protein 2
  – neprilysin
  – 5'-nucleotidase
  – peptidyl-dipeptidase a
  – platelet membrane glycoprotein iib
  – proto-oncogene proteins c-kit
  – receptor, anaphylatoxin c5a
  – receptor, macrophage colony-stimulating factor
  – receptors, complement 3b
  – receptors, complement 3d
  – receptors, ige
  – receptors, igg
  – receptors, interleukin-1
  – receptors, interleukin-2
  – receptors, interleukin-4
  – receptors, interleukin-6
  – receptors, interleukin-7
  – receptors, interleukin-8a
  – receptors, lymphocyte homing
  – antigens, cd44
  – integrin alpha4beta1
  – lymphocyte function-associated antigen-1
  – l-selectin
  – receptors, tumor necrosis factor, type i
  – receptors, tumor necrosis factor, type ii
  – p-selectin
  – vascular cell adhesion molecule-1
  – antigens, differentiation, b-lymphocyte
  – antigens, cd5
  – antigens, cd19
  – antigens, cd20
  – antigens, cd40
  – antigens, cd29
  – antigens, differentiation, t-lymphocyte
  – antigens, cd1
  – antigens, cd2
  – antigens, cd3
  – receptor-cd3 complex, antigen, t-cell
  – antigens, cd4
  – antigens, cd5
  – antigens, cd7
  – antigens, cd8
  – antigens, cd13
  – antigens, cd18
  – antigens, cd26
  – antigens, cd27
  – antigens, cd28
  – antigens, cd56
  – antigens, cd57
  – antigens, differentiation, myelomonocytic
  – antigens, cd14
  – antigens, cd15
  – antigens, cd31
  – antigens, ly
  – antigens, thy-1
  – receptors, tumor necrosis factor, type i
  – arrestin
  – blood group antigens
  – abo blood-group system
  – duffy blood-group system
  – i blood-group system
  – kell blood-group system
  – kidd blood-group system
  – lewis blood-group system
  – ca-19-9 antigen
  – lutheran blood-group system
  – mnss blood-group system
  – p blood-group system
  – rh-hr blood-group system
  – cell adhesion molecules
  – antigens, cd22
  – antigens, cd24
  – antigens, cd31
  – antigens, cd146
  – antigens, cd164
  – cadherins
  – desmosomal cadherins
  – desmocollins
  – desmogleins
  – desmoglein 1
  – desmoglein 2
  – desmoglein 3
  – carcinoembryonic antigen
  – cd4 immunoadhesins
  – cell adhesion molecules, neuronal
  – cell adhesion molecules, neuron-glia
  – activated-leukocyte cell adhesion molecule
  – myelin p0 protein
  – neural cell adhesion molecules
  – antigens, cd56
  – neural cell adhesion molecule l1
  – integrin alphaxbeta2
  – intercellular adhesion molecule-1
  – receptors, lymphocyte homing
  – antigens, cd44
  – integrin alpha4beta1
  – lymphocyte function-associated antigen-1
  – l-selectin
  – selectins
  – e-selectin
  – l-selectin
  – p-selectin
  – vascular cell adhesion molecule-1
  – histocompatibility antigens
  – histocompatibility antigens class i
  – h-2 antigens
  – HLA-A
  – HLA-A1
  – HLA-A2
  – HLA-A3
  – HLA-B
  – HLA-B7
  – HLA-B8
  – HLA-B27
  – HLA-B35
  – HLA-C
  – histocompatibility antigens class ii
  – hla-d antigens
  – HLA-DP
  – HLA-DQ
  – HLA-DR
  – HLA-DR1
  – HLA-DR2
  – HLA-DR3
  – HLA-DR4
  – HLA-DR5
  – HLA-DR6
  – HLA-DR7
  – hla antigens
  – hla-a antigens
  – hla-a1 antigen
  – hla-a2 antigen
  – hla-a3 antigen
  – hla-b antigens
  – hla-b7 antigen
  – hla-b8 antigen
  – hla-b27 antigen
  – hla-b35 antigen
  – hla-c antigens
  – hla-d antigens
  – hla-dp antigens
  – hla-dq antigens
  – hla-dr antigens
  – hla-dr1 antigen
  – hla-dr2 antigen
  – hla-dr3 antigen
  – hla-dr4 antigen
  – hla-dr5 antigen
  – hla-dr6 antigen
  – hla-dr7 antigen
  – minor histocompatibility antigens
  – h-y antigen
  – leukocyte l1 antigen complex
  – calgranulin a
  – calgranulin b
  – lymphocyte antigen 96
  – minor lymphocyte stimulatory antigens
  – variant surface glycoproteins, trypanosoma

– antigens, t-independent

– antigens, viral
  – adenovirus early proteins
  – adenovirus e1 proteins
  – adenovirus e2 proteins
  – adenovirus e3 proteins
  – adenovirus e4 proteins
  – antigens, viral, tumor
  – adenovirus e1a proteins
  – adenovirus e1b proteins
  – antigens, polyomavirus transforming
  – deltaretrovirus antigens
  – htlv-i antigens
  – htlv-ii antigens
  – epstein-barr virus nuclear antigens
  – hemagglutinins, viral
  – hn protein
  – hepatitis antigens
  – hepatitis a antigens
  – hepatitis b antigens
  – Hepatitis B core antigens
  – hepatitis b e antigens
  – Hepatitis B surface antigen
  – hepatitis c antigens
  – hepatitis delta antigens
  – hiv antigens
  – hiv core protein p24
  – hiv envelope protein gp41
  – hiv envelope protein gp120

– autoantigens
  – centromere protein b
  – desmoglein 1
  – desmoglein 3
  – heymann nephritis antigenic complex
  – ldl-receptor related protein 2
  – ldl-receptor related protein-associated protein

– epitopes
  – antigens, tumor-associated, carbohydrate
  – antigens, cd15
  – ca-15-3 antigen
  – ca-19-9 antigen
  – ca-125 antigen
  – epitopes, b-lymphocyte
  – epitopes, t-lymphocyte
  – haptens
  – p-azobenzenearsonate
  – cardiolipins
  – dinitrochlorobenzene
  – nitrohydroxyiodophenylacetate
  – picryl chloride
  – immunodominant epitopes
  – immunoglobulin idiotypes

– isoantigens
  – antigens, human platelet
  – blood group antigens
  – abo blood-group system
  – duffy blood-group system
  – i blood-group system
  – kell blood-group system
  – kidd blood-group system
  – lewis blood-group system
  – ca-19-9 antigen
  – lutheran blood-group system
  – mnss blood-group system
  – p blood-group system
  – rh-hr blood-group system
  – histocompatibility antigens
  – histocompatibility antigens class i
  – h-2 antigens
  – hla-a antigens
  – hla-a1 antigen
  – hla-a2 antigen
  – hla-a3 antigen
  – hla-b antigens
  – hla-b7 antigen
  – hla-b8 antigen
  – hla-b27 antigen
  – hla-b35 antigen
  – hla-c antigens
  – histocompatibility antigens class ii
  – hla-d antigens
  – hla-dp antigens
  – hla-dq antigens
  – hla-dr antigens
  – hla-dr1 antigen
  – hla-dr2 antigen
  – hla-dr3 antigen
  – hla-dr4 antigen
  – hla-dr5 antigen
  – hla-dr6 antigen
  – hla-dr7 antigen
  – hla antigens
  – hla-a antigens
  – hla-a1 antigen
  – hla-a2 antigen
  – hla-a3 antigen
  – hla-b antigens
  – hla-b7 antigen
  – hla-b8 antigen
  – hla-b27 antigen
  – hla-b35 antigen
  – hla-c antigens
  – hla-d antigens
  – hla-dp antigens
  – hla-dq antigens
  – hla-dr antigens
  – hla-dr1 antigen
  – hla-dr2 antigen
  – hla-dr3 antigen
  – hla-dr4 antigen
  – hla-dr5 antigen
  – hla-dr6 antigen
  – hla-dr7 antigen
  – minor histocompatibility antigens
  – h-y antigen

– superantigens
  – minor lymphocyte stimulatory antigens

– vaccines, synthetic
  – vaccines, conjugate
  – vaccines, dna
  – vaccines, edible
  – vaccines, virosome

– biological markers

– antibodies, antineutrophil cytoplasmic

– antigens, differentiation
  – antigens, cd
  – activated-leukocyte cell adhesion molecule
  – antigens, cd1
  – antigens, cd2
  – antigens, cd3
  – receptor-cd3 complex, antigen, t-cell
  – antigens, cd4
  – antigens, cd5
  – antigens, cd7
  – antigens, cd8
  – antigens, cd11
  – antigens, cd11a
  – antigens, cd11b
  – antigens, cd11c
  – lymphocyte function-associated antigen-1
  – antigens, cd13
  – antigens, cd14
  – antigens, cd15
  – antigens, cd18
  – antigens, cd19
  – antigens, cd20
  – antigens, cd22
  – antigens, cd24
  – antigens, cd26
  – antigens, cd27
  – antigens, cd28
  – antigens, cd29
  – antigens, cd30
  – antigens, cd31
  – antigens, cd34
  – antigens, cd36
  – antigens, cd38
  – antigens, cd40
  – antigens, cd43
  – antigens, cd45
  – antigens, cd46
  – antigens, cd47
  – antigens, cd55
  – antigens, cd56
  – antigens, cd57
  – antigens, cd58
  – antigens, cd59
  – antigens, cd79
  – antigens, cd80
  – antigens, cd86
  – antigens, cd94
  – antigens, cd95
  – antigens, cd98
  – antigens, cd98 heavy chain
  – antigens, cd98 light chains
  – large neutral amino acid-transporter 1
  – antigens, cd146
  – antigens, cd147
  – antigens, cd164
  – antigens, thy-1
  – cd40 ligand
  – cytokine receptor gp130
  – fms-like tyrosine kinase 3
  – integrin alpha1
  – integrin alpha2
  – integrin alpha3
  – integrin alpha4
  – integrin alpha5
  – integrin alpha6
  – integrin alphav
  – integrin beta3
  – integrin beta4
  – intercellular adhesion molecule-1
  – kangai-1 protein
  – lysosomal-associated membrane protein 1
  – lysosomal-associated membrane protein 2
  – neprilysin
  – 5'-nucleotidase
  – peptidyl-dipeptidase a
  – platelet membrane glycoprotein iib
  – proto-oncogene proteins c-kit
  – receptor, anaphylatoxin c5a
  – receptor, macrophage colony-stimulating factor
  – receptors, complement 3b
  – receptors, complement 3d
  – receptors, ige
  – receptors, igg
  – receptors, interleukin-1
  – receptors, interleukin-2
  – receptors, interleukin-4
  – receptors, interleukin-6
  – receptors, interleukin-7
  – receptors, interleukin-8a
  – receptors, lymphocyte homing
  – antigens, cd44
  – integrin alpha4beta1
  – lymphocyte function-associated antigen-1
  – l-selectin
  – receptors, tumor necrosis factor, type i
  – receptors, tumor necrosis factor, type ii
  – e-selectin
  – p-selectin
  – vascular cell adhesion molecule-1
  – antigens, cd29
  – antigens, differentiation, b-lymphocyte
  – antigens, cd5
  – antigens, cd19
  – antigens, cd20
  – antigens, cd40
  – antigens, differentiation, t-lymphocyte
  – antigens, cd1
  – antigens, cd2
  – antigens, cd3
  – receptor-cd3 complex, antigen, t-cell
  – antigens, cd4
  – antigens, cd5
  – antigens, cd7
  – antigens, cd8
  – antigens, cd13
  – antigens, cd18
  – antigens, cd26
  – antigens, cd27
  – antigens, cd28
  – antigens, cd56
  – antigens, cd57
  – antigens, differentiation, myelomonocytic
  – antigens, cd14
  – antigens, cd15
  – antigens, cd31
  – antigens, ly
  – antigens, thy-1

– chorionic gonadotropin, beta subunit, human

– fibrinopeptide a

– genetic markers

– oligoclonal bands

– tumor markers, biological
  – alpha-fetoproteins
  – antigens, cd30
  – antigens, tumor-associated, carbohydrate
  – antigens, cd15
  – ca-15-3 antigen
  – ca-19-9 antigen
  – ca-125 antigen
  – autocrine motility factor
  – carcinoembryonic antigen
  – chorionic gonadotropin, beta subunit, human
  – hormones, ectopic
  – ki-67 antigen
  – neprilysin
  – normetanephrine
  – proliferating cell nuclear antigen
  – prostate-specific antigen
  – receptor, erbb-2
  – receptor, erbb-3
  – synaptophysin
  – tissue kallikreins
  – tissue polypeptide antigen

– blood coagulation factor inhibitors

– antithrombin iii

– lupus coagulation inhibitor

– protein c

– protein s

– blood coagulation factors

– beta-thromboglobulin

– calcium

– factor v
  – factor va

– factor vii
  – factor viia

– factor viii
  – factor viiia

– factor ix
  – factor ixa

– factor x
  – factor xa

– factor xi
  – factor xia

– factor xii
  – factor xiia

– factor xiii
  – factor xiiia

– fibrinogen
  – fibrinogens, abnormal

– fibrinopeptide a

– fibrinopeptide b

– kallikreins
  – prekallikrein

– kininogens
  – kininogen, high-molecular-weight
  – kininogen, low-molecular-weight

– plasminogen activator inhibitor 1

– plasminogen activator inhibitor 2

– platelet activating factor

– platelet factor 3

– platelet factor 4

– prothrombin

– thrombin

– thromboplastin

– tissue plasminogen activator

– von willebrand factor

– chemotactic factors

– chemokines
  – beta-thromboglobulin
  – chemokines, c
  – chemokines, cc
  – chemokines, cxc
  – chemokines, cx3c
  – interleukin-8
  – macrophage inflammatory proteins
  – macrophage inflammatory protein-1
  – monocyte chemoattractant proteins
  – monocyte chemoattractant protein-1
  – platelet factor 4
  – rantes

– chemotactic factors, eosinophil
  – n-formylmethionine leucyl-phenylalanine

– chemotactic factors, macrophage

– n-formylmethionine leucyl-phenylalanine

– growth substances

– cyclins
  – cyclin a
  – cyclin b
  – cyclin d1
  – cyclin e

– epidermal growth factor

– fibroblast growth factors
  – fibroblast growth factor 1
  – fibroblast growth factor 2
  – fibroblast growth factor 3
  – fibroblast growth factor 4
  – fibroblast growth factor 5
  – fibroblast growth factor 6
  – fibroblast growth factor 7
  – fibroblast growth factor 8
  – fibroblast growth factor 9
  – fibroblast growth factor 10

– growth inhibitors
  – angiogenesis inhibitors

– hematopoietic cell growth factors
  – colony-stimulating factors
  – colony-stimulating factors, recombinant
  – granulocyte colony stimulating factor, recombinant
  – filgrastim
  – granulocyte macrophage colony-stimulating factors, recombinant
  – erythropoietin
  – erythropoietin, recombinant
  – epoetin alfa
  – granulocyte colony-stimulating factor
  – granulocyte colony stimulating factor, recombinant
  – filgrastim
  – granulocyte-macrophage colony-stimulating factor
  – granulocyte macrophage colony-stimulating factors, recombinant
  – interleukin-3
  – macrophage colony-stimulating factor
  – thrombopoietin
  – stem cell factor

– intercellular signaling peptides and proteins
  – angiogenic proteins
  – angiopoietins
  – angiopoietin-1
  – angiopoietin-2
  – angiostatic proteins
  – angiostatins
  – endostatins
  – fibroblast growth factor 1
  – fibroblast growth factor 2
  – vascular endothelial growth factors
  – vascular endothelial growth factor a
  – vascular endothelial growth factor b
  – vascular endothelial growth factor c
  – vascular endothelial growth factor d
  – vascular endothelial growth factor, endocrine-gland-derived
  – ephrins
  – ephrin-a1
  – ephrin-a2
  – ephrin-a3
  – ephrin-a4
  – ephrin-a5
  – ephrin-b1
  – ephrin-b2
  – ephrin-b3
  – fibroblast growth factors
  – fibroblast growth factor 1
  – fibroblast growth factor 2
  – fibroblast growth factor 3
  – fibroblast growth factor 4
  – fibroblast growth factor 5
  – fibroblast growth factor 6
  – fibroblast growth factor 7
  – fibroblast growth factor 8
  – fibroblast growth factor 9
  – fibroblast growth factor 10
  – nerve growth factors
  – brain-derived neurotrophic factor
  – ciliary neurotrophic factor
  – glia maturation factor
  – glial cell line-derived neurotrophic factors
  – glial cell line-derived neurotrophic factor
  – neurturin
  – nerve growth factor
  – neuregulins
  – neuregulin-1
  – neurotrophin 3
  – pituitary adenylate cyclase-activating polypeptide
  – neuregulins
  – neuregulin-1
  – parathyroid hormone-related protein
  – platelet-derived growth factor
  – proto-oncogene proteins c-sis
  – transforming growth factors
  – transforming growth factor alpha
  – transforming growth factor beta
  – wnt proteins
  – wnt1 protein
  – wnt2 protein

– interleukins
  – interleukin-1
  – interleukin-2
  – interleukin-3
  – interleukin-4
  – interleukin-5
  – interleukin-6
  – interleukin-7
  – interleukin-8
  – interleukin-9
  – interleukin-10
  – interleukin-11
  – interleukin-12
  – interleukin-13
  – interleukin-14
  – interleukin-15
  – interleukin-16
  – interleukin-17
  – interleukin-18

– maturation-promoting factor
  – cdc2 protein kinase

– nerve growth factors
  – brain-derived neurotrophic factor
  – ciliary neurotrophic factor
  – glia maturation factor
  – glial cell line-derived neurotrophic factors
  – glial cell line-derived neurotrophic factor
  – neurturin
  – nerve growth factor
  – neuregulins
  – neuregulin-1
  – neurotrophin 3
  – pituitary adenylate cyclase-activating polypeptide

– neuregulins
  – neuregulin-1

– platelet-derived growth factor
  – proto-oncogene proteins c-sis

– somatomedins
  – insulin-like growth factor i
  – insulin-like growth factor ii
  – nonsuppressible insulin-like activity

– transforming growth factors
  – transforming growth factor alpha
  – transforming growth factor beta

– inflammation mediators

– autacoids
  – angiotensins
  – angiotensin i
  – angiotensin ii
  – angiotensin amide
  – saralasin
  – 1-sarcosine-8-isoleucine angiotensin ii
  – angiotensin iii
  – eicosanoids
  – leukotrienes
  – leukotriene a4
  – leukotriene b4
  – srs-a
  – leukotriene c4
  – leukotriene d4
  – leukotriene e4
  – prostaglandins
  – prostaglandin endoperoxides
  – prostaglandins g
  – prostaglandins h
  – prostaglandin h2
  – 15-hydroxy-11 alpha,9 alpha-(epoxymethano)prosta-5,13-dienoic acid
  – prostaglandins a
  – prostaglandins b
  – prostaglandins d
  – prostaglandin d2
  – prostaglandins e
  – alprostadil
  – dinoprostone
  – prostaglandins f
  – dinoprost
  – 6-ketoprostaglandin f1 alpha
  – prostaglandins i
  – epoprostenol
  – thromboxanes
  – thromboxane a2
  – thromboxane b2
  – histamine
  – kinins
  – bradykinin
  – kallidin
  – kininogens
  – kininogen, high-molecular-weight
  – kininogen, low-molecular-weight
  – tachykinins
  – eledoisin
  – kassinin
  – neurokinin a
  – neurokinin b
  – physalaemin
  – substance p
  – urotensins
  – platelet activating factor
  – serotonin

– chemokines
  – beta-thromboglobulin
  – chemokines, c
  – chemokines, cc
  – chemokines, cxc
  – chemokines, cx3c
  – interleukin-8
  – macrophage inflammatory proteins
  – macrophage inflammatory protein-1
  – monocyte chemoattractant proteins
  – monocyte chemoattractant protein-1
  – platelet factor 4
  – rantes

– prostaglandins, synthetic
  – iloprost
  – prostaglandin endoperoxides, synthetic
  – 15-hydroxy-11 alpha,9 alpha-(epoxymethano)prosta-5,13-dienoic acid
  – prostaglandins a, synthetic
  – prostaglandins e, synthetic
  – arbaprostil
  – 16,16-dimethylprostaglandin e2
  – enprostil
  – misoprostol
  – rioprostil
  – prostaglandins f, synthetic
  – carboprost
  – cloprostenol

– natriuretic peptide, brain

– natriuretic peptide, c-type

– pheromones

– pheromones, human

– sex attractants

– pigments, biological

– adrenochrome

– anthocyanins

– bile pigments
  – bilirubin
  – biliverdine
  – urobilin
  – urobilinogen

– carotenoids
  – beta carotene
  – retinoids
  – acitretin
  – etretinate
  – fenretinide
  – isotretinoin
  – retinaldehyde
  – tretinoin
  – vitamin a
  – xanthophylls
  – canthaxanthin
  – lutein
  – zeta carotene

– ceroid

– flavins
  – riboflavin
  – flavin-adenine dinucleotide
  – flavin mononucleotide

– hemocyanin

– lipofuscin

– melanins

– phycocyanin

– phycoerythrin

– phytochrome
  – phytochrome a
  – phytochrome b

– porphyrins
  – chlorophyll
  – bacteriochlorophylls
  – chlorophyllides
  – pheophytins
  – protochlorophyllide
  – coproporphyrins
  – deuteroporphyrins
  – etioporphyrins
  – hematoporphyrins
  – hematoporphyrin derivative
  – dihematoporphyrin ether
  – mesoporphyrins
  – metalloporphyrins
  – chlorophyll
  – bacteriochlorophylls
  – chlorophyllides
  – protochlorophyllide
  – heme
  – hemin
  – porphyrinogens
  – coproporphyrinogens
  – uroporphyrinogens
  – protoporphyrins
  – uroporphyrins

– prodigiosin

– pterins
  – xanthopterin

– pyocyanine

– retinal pigments
  – opsin
  – rhodopsin

– toxins, biological

– bacterial toxins
  – botulinum toxins
  – botulinum toxin type a
  – cholera toxin
  – cord factors
  – diphtheria toxin
  – exfoliatins
  – leukocidins
  – shiga toxins
  – shiga-like toxin i
  – shiga-like toxin ii
  – shiga toxin
  – streptolysins
  – tetanus toxin
  – virulence factors, bordetella
  – adenylate cyclase toxin
  – pertussis toxin

– endotoxins
  – lipopolysaccharides
  – lipid a
  – o antigens

– enterotoxins
  – cholera toxin
  – shiga toxins
  – shiga-like toxin i
  – shiga-like toxin ii
  – shiga toxin

– exotoxins
  – exfoliatins
  – streptolysins

– hypoglycins

– marine toxins
  – ciguatoxins
  – cnidarian venoms
  – fish venoms
  – holothurin
  – lyngbya toxins
  – mollusk venoms
  – conotoxins
  – omega-conotoxins
  – omega-conotoxin gvia
  – eledoisin
  – saxitoxin
  – tetrodotoxin

– mycotoxins
  – aflatoxins
  – aflatoxin b1
  – aflatoxin m1
  – amanitins
  – citrinin
  – cytochalasins
  – cytochalasin b
  – cytochalasin d
  – fumonisins
  – gliotoxin
  – ibotenic acid
  – muscimol
  – ochratoxins
  – patulin
  – penicillic acid
  – phalloidine
  – sporidesmins
  – sterigmatocystin
  – tenuazonic acid
  – trichothecenes
  – t-2 toxin
  – trichodermin
  – zearalenone

– venoms
  – amphibian venoms
  – batrachotoxins
  – bombesin
  – bufotenin
  – physalaemin
  – arthropod venoms
  – ant venoms
  – bee venoms
  – apamin
  – melitten
  – scorpion venoms
  – charybdotoxin
  – spider venoms
  – omega-agatoxin iva
  – wasp venoms
  – cnidarian venoms
  – fish venoms
  – mollusk venoms
  – conotoxins
  – omega-conotoxins
  – omega-conotoxin gvia
  – eledoisin
  – snake venoms
  – elapid venoms
  – bungarotoxins
  – cobra venoms
  – cobra neurotoxins
  – direct lytic factors
  – hydrophid venoms
  – erabutoxins
  – viper venoms
  – crotalid venoms
  – ancrod
  – batroxobin
  – crotoxin

– virulence factors
  – virulence factors, bordetella
  – adenylate cyclase toxin
  – pertussis toxin

The list continues at List of MeSH codes (D25).

D23